Ansar-ud-Deen Society of Nigeria is a Muslim organization established for the purpose of the educational development of Muslims and also as a body to enhance the moral and social development of the Muslim community in Lagos. It was founded in 1923 as a non-sectarian and non-political educational association, although there are doubts about its non-political stance.

The society started out as a response to the advent of a class of Western trained Christian elites in the colonial capital of Lagos and also to engage in the promotion of reformist ideas and development in the Muslim communities of Lagos and later in Nigeria. The group, however, toed the line that a reformist Islam could co-exist with western innovations and ideas without relegating Islamic principles and values. With her mosque across the country, the organisation leads in propagation of the peace message of Islam using Quran and the Sunnah of the prophet(May peace and mercy of Allah be on him)

Background
By the turn of the twentieth century, an emerging social class of Christian elites had risen to prominence and were emerging as an authority in political and social affairs in Lagos. This was mostly due to the effort of missionaries in promoting Western education, which resulted in the creation of many graduates in different professional fields. The new elites also promoted the use of the word Yoruba to promote a unifying social and ethnic group in Southwestern Nigeria; among the new groups was Samuel Johnson, a pioneering Nigerian historian. The group emerged at a time the communal towns and cities of Western Nigeria were being inundated by the imperial interest of Great Britain. They then decided to carve out ways to maintain and enhance the social and cultural development in modern Yoruba states as a response to the imperial interests of Great Britain. However, in reality, many of the new elites were cooperative with the British mission to unite Nigerian communities.

The role and effect on the Lagos Muslim community of the movement towards hegemony was thought of as good a political and social route. Thus a notion of tolerance among Muslims with other groups in Lagos was accepted, resulting in a polarizing and diverse communal society as promoted by the new elite. However, an awareness of emerging conflicts between Christian elites and the colonial government especially in Lagos and the role Western education played in the emergence of the elites led many Muslims to devise means of educating their communities. These reformist groups were associated with elemental Yoruba organizations called, Egbe (professional associations) and were also influenced by different factors and movements in the Muslim community such as the Ahmadiyya movement in Lagos and itinerant Arabic scholars.

History of Ansar Ud Deen
In 1923, when the Ansar Ud Deen society was formed, it was originally called Young Ansar Ud Deen and started out in Lagos, a cosmopolitan trading and coastal center with foreign and local traders converging to trade goods. Many members of the Lagos Muslim community were integral individuals in the Lagos trading community and had been exposed to the international and imperial trading groups and non trading ideas they brought along. The Muslim community initially flourished in the migrant communities of the Hausa, Nupe and Kanuri ethnic groups and also a permission granted in 1841, which allowed public prayers.  However, in 1908, a dispute emerged in the Lagos Muslim community in reaction to a new water rate effected by the colonial administrators. The majority of the community opposed the rate while the Chief Imam supported the government move. Among many of the young elites who founded Ansar Ud Deen were members who supported the Chief Imam; some were also individuals who left the Ahmadiyya movement in Lagos.  A new group of young educated Muslims, who were largely from the factions that supported the Chief Imam in Lagos, was made up of members of a Juvenile Muslim Society.  Both were united in finding ways to stem a drift in the community and, importantly, to fund Muslim schools along the lines of western education in Lagos. A series of meetings were held in November and December 1924 to discuss on the aforementioned issues and to form an association. On 21 December 1924, the Young Ansar Ud Deen was formed and led by a committee of 42 gentlemen. A number of its original members were associated with Saros in Lagos, bearing names such as Savage, Carew and Williams. Prominent members of the society were Y.k. Gbajabiamila, Hussein Carew, M.A. Okunnu, Hafiz Abu and Yesufu Tairu.

Social structure

Governing structure
The new association and the committee of 42 gentlemen designed an executive body headed by the president and supported by a vice president to partake in the governing affairs of the society, and by 1926, a constitution was enacted to establish rules of conduct. In 1927, the society became officially recognized as a non-governmental association and opened its doors to all members of the Muslim society both men and women. However, in its early years, the activities of the group showed similarities with the improvement unions and missionary societies already existent in Yorubaland. The society's theme of propagation of Islam through translation of Islamic works and the promotion of literary and intellectual pursuit among members and in the general Muslim community was similar to the scholarly ideals of many egbe (professional associations) in the region.

Missionary body
In 1926, the society initiated a mission board which had two prominent members, Mustafa Ekemode (who later became the Chief Imam and head of mission) and M.A. Okunnu. The board was tasked with organizing religious related activities such as open-air praying, celebration of important Islamic dates, child naming ceremonies and fund raising activities. In the case of its social related activities, such as marriages and child naming ceremonies, the group introduced modern approaches to the events.

By the 1940s, the group had expanded into other Yoruba towns and cities and an emerging issue of coordinating the expansion arose. Mustafa Ekemode was called on to be the chief missioner with a salary paid by the society. He was the society's first salaried member.  In the early 1940s, the group gradually withdrew from meetings and prayers at the Lagos Central Mosque, and started its own Friday prayers near its own school. However, in 1954, the grouped fused itself with several committees of the Central Mosque on discussion of some major dates of the Islamic calendar. By then, the group had emerged as a wholly independent religious authority within the Lagos and Islamic Muslim community. In 1955, Ekemode joined the Broadcasting Corporation of Nigeria, and was involved with producing and presenting radio programs while talking on the radio with a distinctive style in Quranic recitations. The style was admired by many Yorubas at the time.

The Role of women
In its early years, women played major factors in the financial solvency of the society and their contributions was noted by the association in its first published newsletter in 1924.  The Ansar Ud Deen society also introduced liberating rules on the role of women in the community and rejected the seclusion of women. Though, the most active women members were wives of officers of the society, the women's wing attracted wealthy women financiers, some of whom built Mosques and schools for the society.

Education mission
The society, whose principal mission was promoting the intellectual pursuits of young children of Muslim parents, opened its first primary school in Alakoro in 1931.  An education board was created in 1933-1934 to govern the educational programs of the society and to manage the new school. In the 1930s, the primary school consumed most of the society's financial capital but this did not deter further expansion. In 1942, a ten-year educational plan was initiated which resolved to establish more primary schools, a secondary school for boys and girls and a teachers training institute. The schools were to emphasize the teaching of Western subjects, though they were also influenced by Arabic teachings, as a prominent pioneer teacher was Arab and Arabic language was an important subject. The teachers training institute opened in 1946, with a large number of Christian teachers and Muslim students from other Yoruba towns and cities. By this time, the society had started expanding to other Yoruba cities through its own effort and cooperation with local Muslim groups, many of whom had seen the relative effectiveness of the Ansar Ud Deen project and wanted a learned hand in the running of schools in their locales. By 1955, the school was coordinating the education affairs of 80 primary schools in the country. The Society's most significant success was its cooperation with the Western Government of Nigeria's Universal Primary Education initiative in 1955. The government's plan envisaged building schools to be operated by voluntary associations, and brought in Ansar Ud deen to run most of the educational concessions given to the Muslim Voluntary Agencies.

In the 1960s, the society participated in the formation of modern Secondary and Grammar schools and, according to research samples, in 1964, close to 30% of Yoruba Muslims were involved with the Ansar Ud Deen Society and about 43% of children Yoruba Muslims attended schools run by Islamic Voluntary agencies.

However, by the mid-1970s, the Federal Government of the Federal Republic of Nigeria took control of schools run by voluntary associations, including those run by Ansar Ud Deen.

Influence in Yoruba land
The success of the society's educational programs and its championing of Islamic reform in Nigeria caught the attention of many Yoruba leaders and communal associations. Egbes, or organized associations, of Muslims in a few towns like Ofa worked with the society in the establishment of primary schools. These projects were usually started as a result of a members' knowledge of the activities of the society in Lagos and brought the society's activities to the knowledge of other professional associates. In Ibadan, the society grew through the effort of the Baale Alesinloye, who introduced and brought the society to Ibadan. Originally, the society faced stiff opposition from the Ibadan Central Mosque authorities,  but with the establishment of a school in 1951, the acceptance of the society grew. By then it had a notable member in the person of Humani Alaga, a prominent market women leader.  Many associations, such as the Young Nawair Ud Deen which sprang from the Muslim community in Abeokuta, later followed the policies of the Ansar Ud Deen in its policy of educational expansion.

References

Yoruba people
Islamic organizations based in Nigeria
Religious organizations based in Lagos
Islamic organizations established in 1923
1923 establishments in Nigeria